Lin Yongqing (born 24 December 1992) is a Chinese swimmer. He competed in the men's 4 × 100 metre freestyle relay event at the 2016 Summer Olympics.

References

External links
 

1992 births
Living people
Olympic swimmers of China
Swimmers at the 2016 Summer Olympics
Sportspeople from Liaoyang
Swimmers from Liaoning
Asian Games medalists in swimming
Asian Games gold medalists for China
Asian Games silver medalists for China
Swimmers at the 2014 Asian Games
Medalists at the 2014 Asian Games
Chinese male freestyle swimmers
21st-century Chinese people